Yogamaya, also venerated as Vindhyavasini, Mahamaya, and Ekanamsha, is a Hindu goddess.

In Vaishnava tradition, she is accorded the epithet Narayani, and serves as the personification of Vishnu's powers of illusion. The deity is regarded as the benevolent aspect of the goddess Durga in the Bhagavata Purana. She is regarded by Shaktas to be a form of Adi Shakti. In Hindu literature, she is born in a Yadava family, as the daughter of Nanda and Yashoda.

Etymology 
Yogamaya refers to “the internal potency of Bhagavan, that arranges and enhances all his pastimes” in the Bhagavad Gita.

The goddess Vindhyavasini gets her name from the Vindhya Range, literally meaning, "she who resides in Vindhya".

Legend
At the time of the birth of Krishna as the eighth child of Devaki and Vasudeva, Yogamaya had been born at the same time at the house of Nanda and Yashoda, as instructed by Vishnu. Vasudeva replaced Krishna with this daughter of Yashoda. When Kamsa tried to kill this infant, believing that she was his prophesied killer, she escaped from the grasp of Kamsa, and turned into her form of Durga. She informed the tyrant that his killer had already been born elsewhere, and subsequently vanished from the prison of Mathura.

Thereafter, she is believed by local lore to have chosen to reside at the Vindhyachala mountains, where her temple is located at present. Some believe she was reborn as Subhadra to help Krishna for establishing dharma.

Shaktism 
Authors Constance Jones and James D. Ryan opine that Vindhyavasini is mentioned in the Devi Mahatmya, an important text that presents various incarnations or forms of the Supreme Goddess of Shaktism (Mahadevi). She is also mentioned in an early 19th-century local text called Vindhya Mahatmya. In both, she is understood to be the Ultimate Reality in its totality. She is also assimilated with Parvati, conceived of as "ultimate divinity".

Vaishnavism 

Yogamaya is regarded to be the embodiment of either the internal or the external potency of Vishnu, or his avatar of Krishna, in Vaishnavism. The goddess, also referred to as Vaishnavi Mahamaya, assumes a number of manifestations like Durga, Ambika, Kshemada, and Bhadrakali, according to the Vishnu Purana.

In the Bhagavata Purana, the asura Hiranyaksha mocks Varaha and references Vishnu's Yogamaya:

According to a 17th century literary poem called the Mukundavilasa, when Bhudevi and Brahma petition Vishnu to intervene in earthly affairs due to the oppression of Kamsa and Shishupala, he recruits a number of deities to assist him in his Krishna avatar: Lakshmi is to be born as Rukmini, Bhudevi is to manifest as Satyabhama, Shesha is to incarnate as Balarama, and Yogamaya is tasked to be born as the daughter of Yashoda.

In the narratives of Krishna, the deity employs the phenomenon of Yogamaya in order to spend time with the cowherd women of Gokulam, the gopis. During his blissful dalliance with the gopis, it is Yogamaya who creates spiritual doppelgangers of each gopi at their houses so that they can also act as chaste wives to their husbands, while also dwelling on the deity.

In the Bhagavad Gita, when Arjuna wonders why Krishna's pastimes and true form are not visible to mortals, he responds by stating that his manifestations are not visible to all men, and that he is veiled by his illusory potency.

When the asura Jalandhara wages a war against Shiva to abduct Parvati, Vishnu employs Yogamaya as an illusory form to break the chastity of the asura's wife, Vrinda. This allows Shiva to prevail in his war.

Due to Yogamaya's service to Vishnu, the deity offers her the occasion of Ekadashi (the eleventh day of every month) for veneration in her honour.

Temples

Yogamaya's temple is located at Vindhyachal, 8 km away from Mirzapur on the banks of river Ganges, in Uttar Pradesh. Another shrine is located in Bandla, Himachal Pradesh, also called Bandla Mata Temple. A huge crowd visits the temple, especially during Navaratri in the Hindu months of Chaitra and Ashvin. In the month of Jyeshtha, the Kajali competition, is held here. The temple is one of the most revered Shakti Peethas of India. The Vindhyavasini Devi is also known popularly by name of Kajala devi. The goddess Kali is adorned in the form of Vindhyavasini Devi.

There is a temple of Saraswati named Ashtbhuja Temple, 3 km away on a hillock, and a temple of goddess Kali in cave called Kali khoh temple. The pilgrims prefer to visit these three temples, which is a part of rite called Trilokan Parikrama.

The goddess is known as "Bijasani devi" central India, and the Bijasani Mata temple is present on the Maharashtra-Madhya Pradesh border.

There is also a temple dedicated to this goddess in Pokhara, Nepal.

See also
Shakti Pitha
Rukmini
Yashoda
Subhadra

References
5.↑ Mahatmya of Maa Vindhyavasini

Bibliography

Hindu goddesses
Vishnu
Vaishnavism
Durga